Piney Creek is a stream in Madison County in the U.S. state of Missouri. It is a tributary of the St. Francis River.

The stream flows to the south-southwest passing under Missouri Route 72 to the west of the Oak Grove community. The stream continues to the southwest passing under Missouri Route D to its confluence with the St. Francis west of Rhodes Mountain and south of the Silver Mine Recreation Area.

Piney Creek was so named on account of scrub pine near its course.

See also
List of rivers of Missouri

References

Rivers of Madison County, Missouri
Rivers of Missouri